Sara Chase is an American actress and singer best known for playing Cyndee Pokorny on the Netflix original series Unbreakable Kimmy Schmidt.

Early life and education 
Chase is from Hartford, Connecticut, and is a graduate of the Boston University College of Fine Arts.

Career 
After graduation, Chase performed the two-woman sketch comedy show Jen & Angie at the Upright Citizens Brigade Theatre in New York and Los Angeles.
Chase starred in the pre-Broadway production of Roman Holiday. She created the role of Principal Rosalie Mullins for Andrew Lloyd Webber and Julian Fellowes' School of Rock off-Broadway production at the Gramercy Theatre.

Chase performed in Broadway's First Date and off-Broadway in The Toxic Avenger and can be heard on their original cast albums. She also won the Best Supporting Actress award from the San Diego Theatre Critics for playing all three mistresses in First Wives Club in its pre-Broadway run.

On television, Chase appeared as a regular on Comedy Central's Michael & Michael Have Issues. Other appearances include The Office, Mercy, Arrested Development, and in the films The Other Guys, Arthur, Hello I Must Be Going, and Little Black Book.  Her comedy sketches have been seen in the Women in Comedy Festival, New York Comedy Festival, and UsWeekly.com.

In 2021, Chase voiced the character of Sasha Reed in the episode "The Star of the Backstage" from season 33 of The Simpsons.

Filmography

Film

Television

References

External links
 

Actresses from Hartford, Connecticut
American stage actresses
Place of birth missing (living people)
American television actresses
Boston University College of Fine Arts alumni
Living people
21st-century American actresses
Year of birth missing (living people)